Devin Lane Clark (born May 22, 1986) is a former American football offensive tackle. He was signed by the Washington Redskins as an undrafted free agent in 2008. He played college football at New Mexico.

Clark has also been a member of the New York Sentinels.

On December 16, 2009 it was reported by OSC that Devin Clark was added to the 2010 Spokane Shock roster. With head coach Rob Keefe stating "When you look at Devin Clark's film from the Redskins, you immediately notice his size and his strength." "At New Mexico, he was a major part of their offensive success and he really excelled in pass protection. With his size and his NFL experience he will be a real asset to our offensive line."

On April 25, 2013, Clark was traded, along with Aaron Garca, to the Orlando Predators in exchange for Amarri Jackson.

References

External links
New Mexico Lobos bio
Washington Redskins bio
Spokane Shock News

1986 births
Living people
Players of American football from Austin, Texas
American football offensive tackles
New Mexico Lobos football players
Washington Redskins players
New York Sentinels players
Spokane Shock players
Arizona Rattlers players
Philadelphia Soul players
San Jose SaberCats players
Orlando Predators players